Trithemis bifida is a species of dragonfly in the family Libellulidae. It is found in the Democratic Republic of the Congo, Ivory Coast, Kenya, Sierra Leone, Zambia, Zimbabwe, and possibly Tanzania. Its natural habitats are subtropical or tropical moist lowland forests and rivers.

References

bifida
Taxa named by Elliot Pinhey
Insects described in 1970
Taxonomy articles created by Polbot